Whynot is an unincorporated community in Randolph County, North Carolina, United States, and is included in the Piedmont Triad metropolitan region. The North Carolina Pottery Highway contains over 100 potteries and galleries in a  region surrounding Seagrove.

History
Whynot was first settled in the 18th century by German and English people, along with the nearby communities of Erect, Hemp, Lonely, Steeds, and Sophia. The community was originally spelled with two separate words, "Why Not".  The origin of town's name came from residents debating a title for their community. A man finally remarked: "Why not name the town Why Not and let's go home?"

The Why Not Academy and Business Institute, a combination public and private school, was located in the community from 1893 to 1916. Whynot has frequently been noted on lists of unusual place names.

Arts and culture
Area residents first began making pottery in the 18th century.  The area still contains several pottery shops including Dirtworks Pottery, Tom Gray Pottery, Dixieland Pottery, Marsh Pottery, Kovack Pottery, Michele Hastings & Jeff Brown Pottery, and Whynot Pottery.

Gallery

See also
 List of unincorporated communities in North Carolina

References

Further reading
Why Not, North Carolina, by William T. Auman and Minnie S. Stuart, Why Not Memorial Association, 1986.

English-American culture in North Carolina
German-American culture in North Carolina
Unincorporated communities in Randolph County, North Carolina
Unincorporated communities in North Carolina